La Colle may refer to:
 La Colle
 La Colle, Monaco
 La Colle-sur-Loup

See also 
 Colle (disambiguation)
 Lacolle (disambiguation)